SAPPHIRE (Stanford AudioPhonic PHotographic IR Experiment, also called Navy-OSCAR 45)  was a satellite built by the Stanford University students in Palo Alto, California.

The satellite was launched on September 30, 2001 together with Starshine 3, PICOSat and PCSat on an Athena 1 rocket at the Kodiak Launch Complex, Alaska, United States.

Its purpose was the training of students, the operation of an infrared sensor, a digital camera, a speech synthesizer and from 2002 the operation of an APRS digipeater. He also served to train midshipmen of the US Naval Academy in the field of satellite control.

The satellite's mission ended in early 2005.

Frequencies
 Uplink: 145.945 MHz
 Downlink: 437.1 MHz
 Mode: 1200 bit/s AFSK
 Call sign: KE6QMD

See also 

 OSCAR

External links 
 . PDF

References 

Satellites orbiting Earth
Amateur radio satellites
Microsatellites
Spacecraft launched in 2001